William Tymms (16 August 1903 – 9 June 1989) was an Australian rules footballer who played with St Kilda and Melbourne in the Victorian Football League (VFL).

Tymms started his career at St Kilda, where he spent two seasons. He played for Prahran in 1924, then made his way to Melbourne and was a half-back flanker in their 1926 premiership team. Best known as a full-back, Tymms represented the VFL five times during his career. He went into football administration after retiring, serving as secretary of the Richmond Football Club from 1955 to 1962.

References

External links

 

1903 births
1989 deaths
Australian rules footballers from Victoria (Australia)
St Kilda Football Club players
Melbourne Football Club players
Prahran Football Club players
Richmond Football Club administrators
Melbourne Football Club Premiership players
One-time VFL/AFL Premiership players